Rhysida nuda, also known as the blue-legged centipede, is a species of centipede in the Scolopendridae family. It is endemic to Australia, and was first described in 1887 by British entomologist George Newport.

Distribution
The species occurs in the Northern Territory, Queensland, New South Wales and Victoria.

Behaviour
The centipedes are solitary terrestrial predators that inhabit plant litter, soil and rotting wood.

References

 

 
nuda
Centipedes of Australia
Endemic fauna of Australia
Fauna of New South Wales
Fauna of the Northern Territory
Fauna of Queensland
Fauna of Victoria (Australia)
Animals described in 1845
Taxa named by George Newport